Cardiff station may refer to:

Cardiff Bay railway station in Wales
Cardiff Central bus station in Wales
Cardiff Central railway station in Wales
Cardiff Queen Street railway station in Wales
Cardiff railway station, New South Wales in Australia